CYP2R1 is cytochrome P450 2R1, an enzyme which is the principal vitamin D 25-hydroxylase. In humans it is encoded by the CYP2R1 gene located on chromosome 11p15.2. It is expressed in the endoplasmic reticulum in liver, where it performs the first step in the activation of vitamin D by catalyzing the formation of 25-hydroxyvitamin D.

Vitamin D 25-hydroxylase activity is also possessed by some other cytochrome P450 enzymes, in particular CYP27A1, which is found in mitochondria.

Function 

CYP2R1 is a member of the cytochrome P450 superfamily of enzymes. The cytochrome P450 proteins are mono-oxygenases which catalyze many reactions involved in drug metabolism and synthesis of cholesterol, steroids and other lipids.

CYP2R1 is present in the endoplasmic reticulum of the liver (the microsomal fraction). It has 25-hydroxylase activity, which converts cholecalciferol (vitamin D3) into calcifediol (25-hydroxyvitamin D3, also known as calcidiol), the major circulatory form of the vitamin. CYP2R1 will also hydroxylate ergocalciferol (vitamin D2), derived from dietary sources, into 25-hydroxyvitamin D2 (ercalcidiol).  These 25-hydroxylated forms of vitamin D, together known as 25(OH)D, bind strongly to the vitamin D-binding protein in blood and are the principal circulating forms of vitamin D. These are commonly measured to determine a person's vitamin D status and establish vitamin D deficiency.

Calcifediol is subsequently converted by the action of 25-hydroxyvitamin D3 1-alpha-hydroxylase to calcitriol, the active form of vitamin D3 which binds to the vitamin D receptor (VDR) and mediates most of the physiological hormonal actions of vitamin D.

Clinical significance 
The conversion of vitamin D, especially cholecalciferol, to 25(OH)D (calcifediol) is one of the key steps in the vitamin D hormonal system. The CYP2R1 enzymatic activity achieving this process was previously thought to be constitutively expressed and stable, so that serum 25(OH)D was a measure of the supply of vitamin D.

CYP2R1 is now known to be regulated, with variations in the expression and activity of CYP2R1 affecting circulating 25(OH)D. Low levels of CYP2R1 activity have been found after 24 hour fasting, in obesity, type 1 and type 2 diabetes and are decreased by glucocorticoids such as dexamethasone.  These conditions are known to be linked to low blood levels of 25(OH)D, where even large doses of vitamin D may not produce an improvement, which can be explained by enzyme activities being low.

Polymorphic variations in CYP2R1
Polymorphic variations in the CYP2R1 gene have the greatest effect on individual serum 25(OH)D concentrations compared with other gene variations.  An inherited mutation in the CYP2R1 gene L99P, which results in the substitution of a proline for a leucine residue at codon 99, eliminates the enzyme activity and is associated with vitamin D-dependent rickets type IB. Another variant is K242N, where lysine at position 242 is substituted by asparagine, give a similar phenotype. Symptoms are low circulating levels of 25(OH)D and classic symptoms of vitamin D deficiency.

Interactive pathway map

Studies in mice
Model organisms have been used in the study of CYP2R1 function. Mice have been generated with knockout of Cyp2r1 and both Cyp2r1 and Cyp27a1. A conditional knockout mouse line called Cyp2r1tm1b(EUCOMM)Wtsi has been generated and animals have undergone a standardized phenotypic screen.

References

External links
 

EC 1.14.13